Agrilus masculinus, the maple agrilus, is a species of metallic wood-boring beetle in the family Buprestidae. It is found in North America.

References

Further reading

 
 
 

masculinus
Beetles of North America
Taxa named by George Henry Horn
Beetles described in 1891
Articles created by Qbugbot